{{Infobox person
| honorific_prefix   = 
| name               = Rachel Khoo
| honorific_suffix   = 
| image              = 
| caption            = 
| birth_name         = 
| birth_date         = 
| birth_place        = Croydon, South London, England
| death_date         = 
| death_place        = 
| death_cause        = 
| resting_place      = 
| resting_place_coordinates = 
| monuments          = 
| nationality        = 
| other_names        = 
| education          = 
| alma_mater         = Central Saint Martin's College of Art and Design
| occupation         = 
| years_active       = 2010–present
| employer           = 
| organization       = 
| agent              = 
| known_for          = 
| notable_works      = 
| style              = 
| television         = {{Plainlist|
 The Little Paris Kitchen: Cooking with Rachel Khoo
 Rachel Khoo's Kitchen Notebook: London
 Rachel Khoo's Kitchen Notebook: Cosmopolitan Cook
 Rachel Khoo's Kitchen Notebook: Melbourne
  Rachel Khoo My Swedish Kitchen
  Zumbo’s Just Desserts
 Rachel Khoo's Simple Pleasures
 Great British Menu
}}
| spouse             = Robert Wiktorin
| partner            = 
| children           = 2
| relatives          = 
| awards             = 
| website            = 
}}

Rachel Khoo (Chinese: 邱瑞秋; born 28 August 1980.) is a British cook, author, and broadcaster who has hosted and co-hosted television cooking shows on the BBC, Food Network, and Netflix.

Early life

Khoo was born in Croydon, South London. She has a younger brother named Michael and attended primary school in Bromley. Her paternal family were Chinese immigrants to Malaysia and were part of the Khoo Kongsi clanhouse in George Town, Penang. Her father is Malaysian Chinese and emigrated to the UK from Ipoh, Perak, at age 16 in 1968. He later met and married her mother, an Austrian native. When Khoo was 12, her father's job in IT took the family to Bavaria, where they lived in the countryside outside Munich for four years. They returned to the UK when she was 16. She attended Central Saint Martins College of Art and Design in London, and earned a degree in art and design.

Career

Early career

After graduating from university, Khoo worked in public relations for the shirt-maker Thomas Pink for two years.  Looking for "adventure" in her life and with no knowledge of French, she quit her job and took a three-month patisserie course at Le Cordon Bleu in Paris in 2006. While living in Paris, she worked part-time as an au pair and sold perfume at Printemps, an upscale department store. After graduating from Le Cordon Bleu, she worked at La Cocotte, a Parisian cookbook store and café, where she ran baking workshops and served as the store's pastry chef.

Both were later translated into English, as Rachel Khoo's Muesli and Granola and Rachel Khoo's Sweet and Savory Pâtés. During this time, she also worked briefly in Germany as a freelancer for Volkswagen, where she ran food-related events.

After successfully pitching UK publishers her concept for a new cookbook, Khoo opened a small restaurant to test recipes for her first English-language cookbook, The Little Paris Kitchen. She prepared and served food from her Paris flat in the Belleville neighbourhood, accommodating just two diners at a time. Using social media to advertise the restaurant, she quickly attracted a large fan base. Later, the BBC commissioned The Little Paris Kitchen: Cooking with Rachel Khoo, her first TV series. Her restaurant closed before production began on the series. The six-episode series was filmed in Khoo's Paris kitchen and around the city. It began airing on British TV on 19 March 2012. Eventually, the series was aired in international markets. The book The Little Paris Kitchen was released in 2012. It has been translated into several languages. The book became a bestseller, selling more than 120,000 copies. Each edition of the television series was watched by over 1.5 million viewers in the UK.

2013 to 2016

Khoo released her second English-language cookbook, My Little French Kitchen, chronicling her travels across France, in September 2013, published by Michael Joseph. My Little French Kitchen sold upwards of 1,000 copies a week.  In 2014, she completed filming two new cooking series for BBC Worldwide: Rachel Khoo’s Kitchen Notebook: London and Rachel Khoo's Kitchen Notebook: Cosmopolitan Cook. Both series aired in the UK and internationally. In Rachel Khoo's Kitchen Notebook: Cosmopolitan Cook, she visited various European and Eurasian cities, including Stockholm and Istanbul, and cooked dishes inspired by her travels. Her cookbook, Rachel Khoo’s Kitchen Notebook, was released in the UK on 12 February 2015. In November 2014, she travelled to Malaysia to film an episode of the series A Cook Abroad.
 
On 9 March 2015, BBC television aired A Cook Abroad: Rachel Khoo's Malaysia, where she visited the home of her father's extended family and explored the cuisine of the country.
Khoo's fourth television series, Rachel Khoo's Kitchen Notebook: Melbourne, premiered in Australia on 23 July 2015 on the network SBS. In February 2016, she was announced as a new judge on the Australian TV cooking competition My Kitchen Rules, for the series' 7th season. Khoo filmed the programme in 2015 while travelling throughout Australia. The new season began airing on Seven Network beginning on 1 February 2016. Khoo appears in 6 episodes of the program. 

Khoo launched Khoollect, a lifestyle-, fashion- and food-oriented online blog in February 2016. The blog is defunct as of 2020.

In April 2016, Khoo filmed Zumbo's Just Desserts in Sydney, alongside pastry chef Adriano Zumbo. The television series was commissioned by the Seven Network, and Khoo served as one of the judges. The programme premiered in Australia on 22 August 2016 and streamed on Netflix in the U.S. in 2018.

2018 to present

Her sixth cookbook, The Little Swedish Kitchen, was released on 26 July 2018. In 2018, Khoo began filming her new television series, My Swedish Kitchen'', in the Swedish countryside. The programme features recipes from the cookbook'. The show premiered for Food Network UK on 22 August 2019. It is expected to air in Germany, Australia and New Zealand, and on BBC Asia.

On 7 February 2021, it was announced Rachel Khoo would be joining as a new judge on Great British Menu when the series returned in spring 2021.

Personal life

In 2006, Khoo moved to Paris, where she lived for eight years. In 2014, she returned to London, settling in Hoxton, a district of Hackney and then moved to Stockholm in 2016. She previously owned a flat in Kensal Green in north-west London, which served as the headquarters of her now-defunct lifestyle blog/studio, Khoolect.  She speaks English, French, German and some Swedish.

In 2014, she became engaged to Swedish man Robert Wiktorin, and they married in 2015. She gave birth to her first child, a boy, in 2016. Her second child, also a boy, was born in early 2019.

Filmography

Bibliography

References

External links 

Khoocollect
BBC - Food - Chefs : Rachel Khoo recipes at BBC
Rachel Khoo's Kitchen Notebook: London on BBC Lifestyle, Nordic
Little Paris Kitchen: Cooking with Rachel Khoo on the Cooking Channel

Talent Agency Profile

1980 births
Alumni of Central Saint Martins
Alumni of Le Cordon Bleu
BBC people
English chefs
English expatriates in France
English expatriates in Sweden
English people of Austrian descent
English people of Chinese descent
English people of Malaysian descent
British food writers
Living people
People from Croydon
British television chefs
Women chefs
Women food writers
Women cookbook writers